Inocencio of Mary Immaculate  (March 10, 1887–October 9, 1934), born Manuel Canoura Arnau, was a priest and member of the Passionist Congregation and was killed during the Asturias revolt. He and his companions are known collectively as the Martyrs of Turon. He was canonised by Pope John Paul II in 1999.

Life
He was born on March 10, 1887, at Santa Cilla do Valadouro (Foz), near the Cantabrian coast in the province of Lugo (Galicia) and joined the Passionist seminary at the age of 14 at Peñafiel, near Valladolid. He joined the Passionist Congregation at Deusto (Biscay) and then continued his philosophy and theology. At Mieres, not far from Turón, he was given the sub-diaconate in 1910, the diaconate in 1912 and was ordained priest in 1920. As a priest he preached missions and also taught in various schools. Whilst he was in Mieres he had been asked by the Brothers of the Christian Schools (De La Salle) to hear the confessions of the children on their school as they prepared for their First Communion. This was at the time of the Asturias revolt, when communists and anti-clericalists had risen up against the Second Spanish Republic.

Martyrdom
On Friday October 5, 1934, a group of strikers forced their way into the Lasallian school in Turón, where Father Inocencio was exercising his priestly ministry. He was imprisoned alongside the eight Brothers in the so-called "House of the People" to await the judgment of the Republican committee. They were condemned to death and, in the early hours of October 9, 1934, were executed by a firing squad. Their bodies were buried in a common grave.

Inocencio is regarded by the Catholic church as one of the Martyrs of the Spanish Civil War. Although his death occurred some two years prior to the outbreak of the war, his death was part of the same violence and anti-clerical feeling of that period in Spain's history.

Canonization

Inocencio and his eight fellow martyrs were declared venerable in 1989, beatified on April 19, 1990, then canonized on November 21, 1999, by Pope John Paul II.

External links
Vatican Biography of Father Innocencio and his companions

See also
 Martyrs of the Spanish Civil War
 498 Spanish Martyrs
 Martyrs of Daimiel
 Red Terror (Spain)

References

1887 births
1934 deaths
Passionists
Spanish Roman Catholic saints
Martyred Roman Catholic priests
20th-century Christian saints
20th-century Roman Catholic martyrs
Executed Spanish people
Beatifications by Pope John Paul II